Maria Lawson is the self-titled debut studio album from British X Factor contestant, Maria Lawson. It reached number 41 on the UK Albums Chart and sold 19,000 copies. https://www.officialcharts.com/charts/albums-chart/20060903/7502/

The album includes its only single, "Sleepwalking", and covers of Lamya's "Black Mona Lisa" and Liberty X's "The Poet". A cover of James Blunt's "You're Beautiful", which she performed during her run on The X Factor, is included as a bonus track.

Track listing
 "Sleepwalking" (includes a sample of the Chi-Lites song "Have You Seen Her")
 "Black Mona Lisa" (originally recorded by Lamya)
 "Give All You Got" 
 "The Poet" (originally recorded by Liberty X)
 "Old School Lovin'" 
 "Your Life" 
 "Let It Break" 
 "His World" (includes a sample from "Midnight Train to Georgia")
 "Overrated"
 "Naked with You"
 "Pretty Face"
 "Woman's Intuition"
 "It's Love"
 "You're Beautiful" (originally recorded by James Blunt)

Charts

References

2006 debut albums
Maria Lawson albums